The TA postcode area, also known as the Taunton postcode area, is a group of 24 postcode districts in South West England, within 19 post towns. These cover western Somerset (including Taunton, Bridgwater, Burnham-on-Sea, Chard, Crewkerne, Dulverton, Highbridge, Hinton St George, Ilminster, Langport, Martock, Merriott, Minehead, Montacute, Somerton, South Petherton, Stoke-sub-Hamdon, Watchet and Wellington), plus very small parts of Dorset and Devon.



Coverage
The approximate coverage of the postcode districts:

|-
! TA1
| TAUNTON
| Taunton (south and town centre), Comeytrowe, Bishops Hull, Holway, Wilton, Lambrook
| Somerset West and Taunton
|-
! TA2
| TAUNTON
| Taunton (north), Norton Fitzwarren, Cheddon Fitzpaine, Kingston St Mary, Monkton Heathfield, West Monkton
| Somerset West and Taunton, Sedgemoor
|-
! TA3
| TAUNTON
| North Curry, Isle Abbots, Stoke St Mary, Stoke St Gregory, Fivehead, Churchinford, Trull
| Somerset West and Taunton, South Somerset, Sedgemoor
|-
! TA4
| TAUNTON
| Bicknoller, Bishops Lydeard, Crowcombe, Milverton, West Bagborough, Williton, Wiveliscombe
| Somerset West and Taunton
|-
! TA5
| BRIDGWATER
| Cannington, Nether Stowey, Over Stowey, Spaxton, Fiddington,
| Sedgemoor, Somerset West and Taunton
|-
! TA6
| BRIDGWATER
|Bridgwater, North Petherton, Wembdon
| Sedgemoor
|-
! TA7
| BRIDGWATER
|Puriton, Polden Hills, Westonzoyland, Middlezoy, Shapwick, Catcott, Ashcott, Chedzoy
| Sedgemoor, Somerset West and Taunton, South Somerset
|-
! TA8
| BURNHAM-ON-SEA
| Burnham on Sea, Berrow, Brean, Steep Holm
| Sedgemoor
|-
! TA9
| HIGHBRIDGE
| Highbridge, West Huntspill, Brent Knoll
| Sedgemoor
|-
! TA10
| LANGPORT
| Langport, Curry Rivel, Huish Episcopi, Hambridge and Westport
| South Somerset
|-
! TA11
| SOMERTON
| Somerton, Keinton Mandeville, Charlton Mackrell, Charlton Adam
| South Somerset, Mendip
|-
! TA12
| MARTOCK
| Martock, Kingsbury Episcopi, Ash, Stembridge, Coat, Stapleton, Witcombe
| South Somerset
|-
! TA13
| SOUTH PETHERTON
| South Petherton, Over Stratton, Lopen, East Lambrook, West Lambrook
| South Somerset
|-
! TA14
| STOKE-SUB-HAMDON
| Stoke-sub-Hamdon, Norton-sub-Hamdon, Chiselborough
| South Somerset
|-
! TA15
| MONTACUTE
| Montacute
| South Somerset
|-
! TA16
| MERRIOTT
| Merriott
| South Somerset
|-
! TA17
| HINTON ST. GEORGE
| Hinton St George, Dinnington
| South Somerset
|-
! TA18
| CREWKERNE
| Crewkerne, Haselbury Plucknett, West Chinnock, Misterton, North Perrott
| South Somerset, Dorset
|- 
! TA19
| ILMINSTER
| Ilminster, Ashill, Ilton, Dowlish Wake, Shepton Beauchamp, Donyatt, Whitelackington
| South Somerset
|-
! TA20
| CHARD
| Chard, Buckland St Mary, Forton, Combe St Nicholas, Tatworth, Thorncombe
| South Somerset, Dorset, Somerset West and Taunton
|-
! TA21
| WELLINGTON
| Wellington, West Buckland, Rockwell Green, Tonedale
| Somerset West and Taunton, Mid Devon
|-
! TA22
| DULVERTON
| Dulverton, Brompton Regis, Exebridge, Exton
| Somerset West and Taunton
|-
! TA23
| WATCHET
| Watchet, Washford, Roadwater, Luxborough, Doniford, Treborough
| Somerset West and Taunton
|-
! TA24
| MINEHEAD
| Minehead, Porlock, Dunster, Wheddon Cross, Exford, Blue Anchor
| Somerset West and Taunton
|}

Map

See also
Postcode Address File
List of postcode areas in the United Kingdom

References

External links
 Royal Mail's Postcode Address File
A quick introduction to Royal Mail's Postcode Address File (PAF)

Postcode areas covering South West England